Myxine mcmillanae, the Caribbean hagfish, is a species of hagfish. It is a scaleless, eel-like fish found in Caribbean waters that feeds off material from the surface that drifts down.  It is rarely seen as it lives in very deep water from 2,300-4,950 ft (700-1,500 m) and likes to burrow into the mud.  Their bodies are grey with  contrasting white heads.  They have seven internal gills connected to a single opening on each side of the body.

References 

 

Myxinidae
Fish of the Caribbean
Fish described in 1991